Nicholas John Tate (born 18 June 1942) is an Australian actor popularly known for his roles as pilot Alan Carter in the 1970s science fiction television series Space: 1999, and James Hamilton in the 1980s Australian soap opera Sons and Daughters.

Life and career
Tate was born in Sydney. His parents were the actors John Tate and Neva Carr Glyn. His maternal grandparents were also actors, originally from Ireland and Great Britain, who performed in vaudeville. His father, of Russian descent, also had a connection to the works of Space:1999 creator Gerry Anderson, being a secondary voice actor in Thunderbirds.

Tate's big break came with the Australian television series My Brother Jack, followed by a production of the musical The Canterbury Tales where he played "Nicholas the Gallant" for eighteen months on stage and on tour throughout the country. This was followed by the 1970 Australian television series Dynasty about rich, powerful family, where he joined his father John Tate for the first time onscreen; the two playing father and son roles.

Tate portrayed astronaut Alan Carter in the British science fiction series Space: 1999, which was broadcast from 1975 to 1977, though the series began production in late 1973. In 1976, he broke through in film with an AACTA award-winning role in the movie The Devil's Playground. He continued to work in film with supporting roles in a number of theatrical films, including  The Year My Voice Broke, Richard Attenborough's Cry Freedom, Return from the River Kwai, Evil Angels, and Steven Spielberg's Hook. From 1985 to 1986, he portrayed James Hamilton in the Australian soap opera Sons and Daughters. Tate has also made guest appearances on numerous American TV shows, such as The X-Files, Dr. Quinn, Medicine Woman, Star Trek: The Next Generation (in the 1990 episode "Final Mission"), Murder, She Wrote, Star Trek: Deep Space Nine (in the 1998 episode "Honor Among Thieves"), Farscape and in the Lost episode "Tabula Rasa".

On stage, Tate appeared in the TRIP (Tony Rudlin Ingrid Pitt Productions) stage production of Duty Free (later known as Don't Bother To Dress), by Emmerdale writer Neville Siggs, which ran from 1976 to 1977 at the Bristol Hippodrome. He returned to the stage in 2006 when he played the leading role of Captain Edward J. Smith in the Australian premiere of the musical Titanic.

Tate is also known for his voiceover work in theatrical trailers for such films as Jurassic Park and Mission: Impossible, as well as work in commercials, including Guinness beer spots airing beginning in 2006. Tate and four other well known voice artists (Don LaFontaine, John Leader, Mark Elliot, and Al Chalk) parodied their individual voiceover styles en route to an awards show in a 1997 short film, 5 Men and a Limo.

In 2000, he provided the voice for the Australian tycoon Ozzie Mandrill in the game Escape from Monkey Island.

Tate resides in both Australia and the US.

Filmography

The Skin of Our Teeth (TV Movie 1959)
My Brother Jack (TV Mini-Series 1965) – Davey
A Man for All Seasons (1966) – Master at Arms (uncredited)
Submarine X-1 (1968) – Leading Seaman X-1 (credited as Nicholas Tate)
The Oblong Box (1969) – Young Man in Tavern (uncredited)
Battle of Britain (1969) – RAF Pilot (uncredited)
Dynasty (TV Series 1970–1971) – Peter Mason
Homicide (TV Series 1972–1973) – Joseph Taylor / John Mason / Barry West
Behind the Legend (TV Series 1974) – Captain Sanderson
NBC Special Treat (TV Series 1975) – Capt. Harry Masters
Space: 1999 (TV Series 1975-77) – Alan Carter
The Devil's Playground (1976) – Brother Victor
The Day After Tomorrow, Into Infinity (TV Movie 1976) – Captain Harry Masters
The Strange Case of the End of Civilization as We Know It (1977) – 1st Australian
Summerfield (1977) – Simon Robinson
Undercover Lover (1979) – Jensen Fury
Play for Today (TV Series 1980) – Steve Jackson
The Gentle Touch (TV Series 1981) – Johnny Delvaux
A Country Practice (TV Series 1982) – Graham Porter
Patrol Boat (TV Series 1983) – Major Winn
The Gold and the Glory (1984) – Joe Lucas
The Empty Beach (1985) – Brian Henneberry
Sons and Daughters (1985-86) – James Hamilton Ivanhoe (TV Movie 1986) – Sir Cedric (voice)The Year My Voice Broke (1987) – Sergeant PierceCry Freedom (1987) – RichieEvil Angels (1988) – CharlwoodReturn from the River Kwai (1989) – Lt. Commander HuntStar Trek: The Next Generation (TV Series 1990) – DirgoSteel and Lace (1991) – DuncanHook (1991) – NoodlerThe Public Eye (1992) – Henry Haddock Jr.Silent Cries (1993)Red Planet (TV Mini Series short 1994) – Colony LeaderBed of Roses (1996) – BayardStar Wars: Shadows of the Empire (Video Game 1996) – Prince Xizor (PC version) / IG-88 (PC version) (voices)The Real Adventures of Jonny Quest (TV Series 1996) – Darcy / Hunter #2 / Pirate #2 / Pirate #3 (voices)Cow & Chicken (TV Series 1997) – English Guy 52 / Egg Buyer (voices)Star Trek: Deep Space Nine (TV Series 1998) – Liam BilbyThe X-Files (TV Series 1999) – Dr. Eugene OpenshawEscape from Monkey Island (Video Game 2000) – Ozzie Mandrill (voice)The Lost World (TV Series 2001) – Dr. William GullThe Junction Boys (TV Movie 2002) – Smokey HarperFarscape (TV Series 2003) – R. Wilson MunroeLost (TV Series 2004) - Dr. SmeeThe Vanished (Short 2005) – RoyFlushed Away (Video Game 2006) - Fat Barry (voice)The Gene Generation (2007) – DoctorThe Devil's Playground: Filmmaking by Faith (Video short 2008) - Himself - Actor – Brother VictorEast of Everything (TV Series 2009) – Gerry WatkinsThe Pacific (TV Mini Series 2010) – Tom SmeeKiller Elite (2011) – Commander BQian Xuesen (2012) – KimballThe Great Gatsby (2013) – Taxi DriverLupin III (2014) – Thomas DawsonMad Max (Video Game 2015) – The Mystic (voice)The Snow Queen 2: An Icy Adventure (2015) – Guard (voice)Rake (TV Series 2016) – Julian TallowThe Blacklist (TV Series 2017) – Arthur KilgannonFirestorm (TV Movie 2018/II) – NASA Chief (voice)The Strange Chores (TV Series 2019) – Helsing (voice)Psychonauts 2'' (Video Game 2021) - Compton Boole / Dr. Potts (voices)

References

External links
 
 
 Nick Tate at Voice Chasers

1942 births
Australian male film actors
Australian male television actors
Australian male video game actors
Australian male voice actors
Australian people of Russian descent
Australian people of British descent
Australian people of Irish descent
Best Actor AACTA Award winners
Living people
Male actors from Sydney